The Judith River Formation is a fossil-bearing geologic formation in Montana, and is part of the Judith River Group.  It dates to the Late Cretaceous, between 79 and 75.3 million years ago, corresponding to the "Judithian" land vertebrate age. It was laid down during the same time period as portions of the Two Medicine Formation of Montana and the Oldman Formation of Alberta.
It is an historically important formation, explored by early American paleontologists such as Edward Drinker Cope, who named several dinosaurs from scrappy remains found here on his 1876 expedition (such as Monoclonius).  Modern work has found nearly complete skeletons of the hadrosaurid Brachylophosaurus.

Lithology
The Judith River Formation is composed of mudstone, siltstone and sandstone. Coal beds, bentonite and coquinas are also observed.

Relationship with other units
The Judith River Formation conformably overlies the Claggett Formation and Pakowki Formation. It is overlain by the Bearpaw Formation. It is equivalent to the Belly River Formation in the southern Canadian Rockies foothills, the Lea Park Formation in central Alberta and the Wapiti Formation in the northwestern plains.

Sub-divisions

The Judith River Formation is divided into four members, the Parkman Sandstone Member, the McClelland Ferry Member, the Coal Ridge member, and the Woodhawk Member. The McClelland Ferry Member (78.7-76.3 Ma) is believed to be equivalent to the Oldman Formation, with the Coal Ridge Member (76.3-75.3 Ma) equivalent to the Dinosaur Park Formation.

Fauna
Faunal list follows a review published by Ashok Sahni in 1972 unless otherwise noted.

Amphibians
There are three potential species of discoglossid frogs. Hip bones, possibly representing a North American member of the European spadefoot toad family are also known from the formation.

Bony fish

Cartilaginous fish

Ornithischian dinosaurs

Choristoderes

Crocodilians

Lizards

Theropod dinosaurs

Turtles

See also
 List of dinosaur-bearing rock formations

References

Campanian Stage
Cretaceous Montana
Cretaceous geology of South Dakota
Stratigraphy of Alberta